Kodjoli (also Kotcholi) is a village in the commune of Kontcha in the Adamawa Region of Cameroon, near the .

Population 
In 1971, Kodjoli contained 54 inhabitants, mainly Fula people

At the time of the 2005 census, there were 361 people in the village.

References

Bibliography
 Jean Boutrais (ed.), Peuples et cultures de l'Adamaoua (Cameroun) : actes du colloque de Ngaoundéré, du 14 au 16 janvier 1992, ORSTOM, Paris ; Ngaoundéré-Anthropos, 1993, 316 p. 
 Dictionnaire des villages de l'Adamaoua, ONAREST, Yaoundé, October 1974, 133 p.

External links
 Kontcha, on the website Communes et villes unies du Cameroun (CVUC)

Populated places in Adamawa Region